The Comité départemental de libération (departmental liberation committee) was a structure of the French Resistance.  In 1944, in each department, the Resistance unified around a civil resistance structure (the Comité) and a military one (the French Forces of the Interior).  The Comités developed out of the desire of the MUR (Mouvements Unis de la Résistance, or MUR) and the Free French Forces in London under general De Gaulle to give political representation to the Resistance forces fighting in France. In each commune, a Comité local de libération (local liberation committee) represent the Comité départemental de libération.

Newspaper 

The CDL created the daily newspaper,  with a radical socialist communist outlook.  In December 1944, this became the newspaper, .

References

Further reading 

 

 

 

 

 

 

 

French Resistance